Carter Township is one of nine townships in Spencer County, Indiana. As of the 2010 census, its population was 3,258 and it contained 1,327 housing units.

History
Carter Township was named for Thomas Carter, a county commissioner.

Geography

Cities and towns
Dale
Santa Claus

Unincorporated towns
Lincoln City
Mariah Hill

References

External links
 Indiana Township Association
 United Township Association of Indiana

Townships in Spencer County, Indiana
Townships in Indiana